Ciavarro is an Italian surname. Notable people with the surname include:

 Luigi Ciavarro, Italian actor
 Massimo Ciavarro (born 1957), Italian actor

See also
 Ćavar, Croatian surname

Italian-language surnames